Jan I of Żagań ( – 12 April 1439 in Żagań) was a Duke of Żagań-Głogów, since 1397 (until 1412 with his brothers as co-rulers), since 1403 Duke of Żagań, Krosno Odrzańskie and Świebodzin (again, until 1412 with his brothers as co-rulers) and since 1412 sole ruler of Żagań and Przewóz.

He was the eldest son of Henry VIII the Sparrow, Duke of Głogów by his wife Katharina, daughter of Duke Władysław of Opole.

Life
At the time of Henry VIII's death (14 March 1397) his sons were minors. Duke Rupert I of Legnica took the regency of Głogów until 1401, when Jan I formally assumed the guardianship over his younger brothers Henry IX the Older, Henry X Rumpold and Wenceslaus and began his personal rule in Szprotawa, Przemków, Sulechów, half of Głogów, and Bytom Odrzański.

In 1403 their aunt Hedwig of Legnica (Henry VI the Older's widow) renounced her dower lands (Żagań, Krosno Odrzańskie and Świebodzin) to Jan I and his brothers, who ruled jointly all the lands. Thanks to the Privilege of Elector Rudolf III of Saxony in 1408 he could maintain the unity of his Duchy, despite the protest of his brothers, who claimed their own districts. Ultimately, the division was made in 1412: Jan I retained Żagań, and one year later (in 1413) he also took possession over the Duchy of Przewóz, in the Polish-German border area (obtained as a result of his marriage with Scholastika, a daughter of Elector Rudolph III).

After the extinction of the main branch of the Dukes of Legnica in 1419, Jan I played an important role at the request of many of the cities of Lower Silesia: he presided the initiative of creating an organization to fight against the gangs of robbers whose regular attack in the roads, cities and monasteries.

Jan I performed faithfully his duties as vassal of Bohemia, and therefore in 1420 he took part in the expedition of Emperor Sigismund against the Hussites, and on July 28 of that year he assisted to his coronation as King of Bohemia in Prague.

Three years later, John participated together with his brothers in the negotiations between the Emperor and Teutonic Knights in Preszburg (now Bratislava), where was decided an eventual war against Poland. However, given the growing difficulties of the Emperor with the Hussites and the Teutonic Knights's requests for the city of Kežmarok in exchange for his help, this meeting was unsuccessfully.

Continued from husytami struggle occurred in the years 1427-1428, when together with his brother Henryk Senior IX supported militarily threatened Łużyckie City. On 1 November 1428 the brothers defeated the Hussite troops at the Battle of Kratzau.

In 1429 Jan I went with the Emperor to Łuck, Lithuania, where he took part in the congress were was decided the coronation of Vytautas the Great as King. At the same time, in connection with the growing power of the Hussites, the Duke of Żagań decided to pay them high contributions, which was to ensure the safety of his lands.

However, since some time ago, Jan I began to secretly promote the Hussite movement and his revolucionary ideals. On 19 April 1433, together with his brother Henry IX the Older and the Dukes of Oleśnica, he went on tour to Kalisz, where he promised to the Polish King Władysław II Jogaila his participation in the proposed expedition against the Hussites of Krzyżakom (these actions may be, however, a simple desire to safeguard his Duchy against the Hussites in case of a war).

After the death of Emperor Sigismund, Jan I stood on the side of his son-in-law Albert V of Habsburg, and on 3 December 1438 he paid tribute to him in Wroclaw. AQs a reward of his loyalty, the new King gave Jan I many benefits, including the right of minting coins in the cities of Szprotawa and Żagań.

Jan I had a radical and oppressive rule against his subjects, which led to a conflict with the Augustinian Order in Żagań. At some point, he even captured and imprisoned the Abbot of the monastery, for which he was excommunicated. Because of these events, in contemporary sources he was considered a cruel man and even a sadist, as was further described in the "Roczniku Głogowskim": when he had sexual relations with his wife he tend to sharpen his spurs. Finally, unable to withstand the brutal treatment of her husband, Scholastika attempted to escape from Żagań. However, she was captured and confined by order of her husband in Nowogród Bobrzański without the right to return to the castle or the capital of the Duchy.

Jan I died on 12 April 1439 in Żagań, was buried in Ducal mausoleum of the Augustinian church in Żagań.

Marriage and issue
By 1405, Jan I married with Scholastika (b. ca. 1393 – d. 12 May 1461), daughter of Rudolf III, Duke of Saxe-Wittenberg and Elector of Saxony. They had ten children:
Anna (b. ca. 1408 – d. bef. 4 November 1437), married by 1424 to Count Albert VIII of Lindow-Ruppin.
Hedwig (b. ca. 1410 – d. Bernburg, 14 May 1497), married on 11 March 1434 to Prince Bernhard VI of Anhalt-Bernburg.
Balthasar (b. ca. 1415 – d. Przewóz, 15 July 1472).
Rudolf (b. ca. 1418 – killed in battle, Chojnice, 18 September 1454).
Margareta (b. ca. 1425 – d. Salzderhelden, aft. 9 May 1491), married firstly by 1435 to Count Volrad II of Mansfeld, secondly in 1450 Count Henry XI of Honstein-Wittenberg and thirdly bef. 20 June 1457 to Duke Henry III of Brunswick-Grubenhagen.
Barbara (b. ca. 1426 – d. by 28 July 1476).
Scholastika (b. ca. 1428 – d. bef. 1489).
Agnes (b. ca. 1430 – d. by 6 December 1473).
Wenceslaus (b. ca. 1434 – d. 29 April 1488).
Jan II the Mad (b. 16 April 1435 – d. 22 September 1504).

Scholastika never left Nowogród Bobrzański, because this territory was granted to her in her husband's will as her dower.  She ruled it until her death.

Footnotes

References

Genealogical database by Herbert Stoyan
JAN I ŻAGAŃSKI
This article was translated from an original in the Polish Wikipedia.

|-

|-

1380s births
1439 deaths

Year of birth uncertain
People excommunicated by the Catholic Church
Dukes of Żagań